Sandy MacKay was a politician in the State of Michigan.

Biography
MacKay was born Alexander MacKay on January 13, 1881 in Milwaukee, Wisconsin. In 1901 he married Cora E. Winslow, who died in 1919. On July 7, 1924 he married Anna Bowman. MacKay was Episcopalian and was known to be a member of Freemasonry, the Independent Order of Odd Fellows, and the Knights of Pythias. He died on December 9, 1952.

Career
MacKay served in the Michigan State House of Representatives from 1937 to 1952. He was a jeweler and a postmaster by trade.

References

Politicians from Milwaukee
Members of the Michigan House of Representatives
Michigan postmasters
1881 births
1952 deaths
20th-century American politicians